This is a record of the Peru national football team's results at the CONCACAF Gold Cup. Peru was invited for the 2000 edition of the North American tournament, its first and  only appearance. Despite having been invited only once, Peru is ranked 19th in the historic ranking of the CONCACAF Gold Cup tournament.

History
Peru was invited to join the CONCACAF Gold Cup tournament along with Colombia and South Korea. Positioned in Group B of the tournament, Peru started out with a 1–1 tie with Haiti, and a 1–0 loss to the United States. This was enough for Peru to advance and face Honduras, which had ended first in their group. Peru won this quarter-finals match with a 5–3 result. In the semi-finals, Peruvian defenders made a series of mistakes, including an own goal, and the only goal of Peru against Colombia came from Roberto Palacios; Colombia defeated Peru 2–1. Peru placed fourth in the North American competition based on cumulative result.

Matches

Record players

Nine players have been fielded in all four Gold Cup matches for Peru.

Top goalscorers

Over the course of four matches, Roberto Palacios was the only Peruvian to score more than once in the 2000 Gold Cup. At the time, he played for Mexican side Tecos UAG.

References

Countries at the CONCACAF Gold Cup
Peru national football team